The Margolin or (MCM pistol) Practice Shooting Pistol is a .22 LR pistol primarily used for competitive target shooting in 25m Standard Pistol class under the rules of the International Shooting Sport Federation for bullseye round-target shooting at 25 m. The Margolin has been used since the 1950s, and complies with all international competition standards.

History 
The pistol was designed by Mikhail Vladimirovich Margolin (1906–1975). It was produced since 1948 and made its international debut at the 36th World Shooting Championships held in 1954 at Caracas, Venezuela.

A very accurate, reliable and economically priced pistol of functional and simple design. 
The designer himself was blind - he was fighting in the Red Army against the "bandits" (anti-communist rebels) in the aftermath of the Russian Civil War and in 1924 (at the age of 18) had head injury resulting in total loss of vision.

There is some criticism of the pistol's elevated plane of sight, blaming it on an incorrect notion that the designer could not aim his pistol. However, Margolin's raised plane of sight is a deliberate design feature that increased the accuracy of the  pistol. The bridge that made the rear sight stationary combined with the  unusually high sights allows the shooter to hold the pistol lower and  aligns barrel with the shoulder, giving the shooter an improvement in control in rapid fire competition. The AK-47, designed between 1946 and 1948, like the Margolin, had high sights which lowered the barrel, put it more in  line with the shoulder, reducing muzzle climb.

The barrel, being comparatively light-weight, can be equipped with an under barrel weight for added steadiness.

Variants 
 MTs-1 (МЦ-1)
 MCM Standard Small-bore Pistol (Пистолет малокалиберный стандартный МЦМ)
 MTsU (МЦУ)
 Baikal "Margo" (МЦМ-К «Марго») A more concealable version of the pistol, Margo is available for a less formal target shooting and self-defence applications. The barrel is shortened to 98 mm and original sights are simplified in this version.
 MP-449 - .25 ACP variant
 IZh-77 (ИЖ-77) - non-lethal gas pistol

There were also a limited quantity made by the Norinco in China called "PS-01". Compared with the original, the Chinese version has some subtle differences, include the fully adjustable rear sight system and non-adjustable front sight blade and threaded muzzle.

Users

 : for sport shooting
 
 
 
 : target pistols MTs-1 were exported from the USSR to the UK and used by sport shooters

Former Users

References

Sources 
 Спортивный малокалиберный самозарядный пистолет конструкции Марголина // Охотничье, спортивное огнестрельное оружие. Каталог. М., 1958. стр.74-75

External links 

 "MCM Standard Small-bore Pistol", manufacturer's overview of  MCM (aka "Margolin"), with downloadable specs
 Guns Magazine, September 1958 'The Man To Beat In Moscow'
 Biography: Mikhail Vladimirovich Margolin (Russian)
 Margolin .22 Target Pistols

Semi-automatic pistols of the Soviet Union
.22 LR pistols
Izhevsk Mechanical Plant products
Weapons and ammunition introduced in 1948